Gelb (released 2005 on Strangeways) is the fifth studio album from futurepop-electronic body music project Neuroticfish.

Track listing
"Loading" - 1:40
"Why Don't You Hate Me?" - 6:45
"The Bomb" - 5:55
"I Don't Need The City" - 4:39
"I Never Chose You" - 6:11
"Waving Hands" - 5:03
"Short Commercial Break" - 0:40
"Ich Spüre Keinen Schmerz" - 4:24
"Are You Alive?" - 5:29
"You're the Fool" - 4:56
"Solid You" - 4:43
"They're Coming to Take Me Away" - 3:33 (cover of Napoleon XIV song)
"Suffocating Right" - 5:24

References

External links
See more: http://www.neuroticfish.com/page/?p=214#more-214

2005 albums
Neuroticfish albums